Anoteropsis aerescens is a species of wolf spiders, that is distinguished from all other Anoteropsis species by the shape of the median apophysis of the male bulb and the external sclerites of the female epigyne, especially the wide median septum. It is found in New Zealand.

Name
The species name aerescens is derived from Latin. Aeramen means bronze.

References

External links
Research on New Zealand wolf spiders (see page 21), Fauna of New Zealand, 2002.

Lycosidae
Spiders of New Zealand
Spiders described in 1887